Herb Scharfman (August 24, 1912 – February 21, 1998) was an American photographer notable for several famous photographs of American sports people published by Sports Illustrated and other publications.

Scharfman, a native of Chicago, began his career in New York as a stringer for International News Photo. His picture of Rocky Marciano's knockout punch in a 1952 bout against Jersey Joe Walcott is widely considered to be one of the most iconic photographs in the history of photojournalism. He later chronicled Roger Maris during his pursuit of Babe Ruth's single-season home run record in 1961. Scharfman's photo of that record breaking moment is one of baseball's most famous photos.

After International News Photo went out of business, Scharfman joined the staff of Sports Illustrated. Although his photographs graced the magazine's cover fifteen times in a ten-year span, he is best known for a photo in which he appears—Neil Leifer's shot of Muhammad Ali standing over a fallen Sonny Liston in their 1964 rematch. Scharfman was directly across the ring from Leifer, appearing between the legs of Ali in the iconic image. Lefier later said, "Herbie Scharfman was one of the greats, but on that night, he was in the wrong seat."

References

External links
Famous Marciano-Walcott Photo
Scharfman's Photo of Maris' 61st homer
Leifer discusses Scharfman in Ali-Liston photo
Gallery of Scharfman's Roger Maris photos
SI Cover shot of Curt Flood
Herb Scharfman bio

1912 births
1998 deaths
American photojournalists
Journalists from New York City